Working On My Farewell is the fourth studio album by the folk-singer John Craigie. It was released in January 2015 on Zabriskie Point Records. Recorded in small studios in Santa Cruz, California, and Portland, Oregon, this album is famous for being Craigie's "electric album", with each song being played on electric guitar – a departure from his primarily acoustic style. Although promoted as electric, it is actually one of Craigie's quietest and most melancholic albums, being compared to Bruce Springsteen's Nebraska and Beck's Sea Change'. The title "Working On My Farewell"is taken from the lyrics of the song "Rexroth's Daughter" by Greg Brown 

As with the three previous studio albums, Randy Schwartz appears on drums and Cian Riordan is chief engineer.

Track listing

Personnel 
John Craigie – electric guitar, vocals, percussion, producer
Randy Schwartz - drums, percussion, vocals
Justin Landis- electric guitar, electric bass
Niko Daoussis - electric guitar, electric bass
Steve Varney - electric guitar
Leigh Jones - vocals, percussion
Kat Fountain - vocals
Ben Darwish - piano, Wurlitzer, Rhodes, organ
Jason Montgomery - pedal steel guitar
Laurie Shook - ghost vocals, banjo
Anna Tivel - violin
Jamie Mefford - Rhodes

Production:
Cian Riordan - engineering
Jamie Mefford - mixing

References

John Craigie (musician) albums
2015 albums